Jacob's Ford may refer to:

 Bnot Ya'akov Bridge, site of an ancient ford across the River Jordan in Israel
 Battle of Jacob's Ford (1179) Battle between crusaders and Ayyubids
 Mont Clare Bridge, site of a ford, called Jacob's Ford for a time, across the Schuylkill River in Pennsylvania, USA

See also
 Jacob Ford (disambiguation)